Body & Brain (also known as Dahn Hak or Dahnhak), formerly called Dahn Yoga, is a business  founded in 1985 by Ilchi Lee that teaches a Korean physical exercise system called Brain Education. In Korean, dahn means "primal, vital energy", and hak means "study of a particular theory or philosophy". News sources have described its exercises as "a blend of yoga, tai chi, and martial arts exercises". Body & Brain is taught through for-profit studios as well as community centers. Ilchi Lee's Brain Education is considered pseudoscience.

Training methods 

According to Body & Brain Yoga Tai Chi: A Beginner's Guide to Holistic Wellness, a book published by Best Life Media, Body & Brain has "three unique characteristics": "the mastery and use of energy", "enhancing the body-brain connection", and "self-managed, holistic health care". The practice draws upon traditional notions of ki, also known as chi or qi. A typical class begins with what is called "Meridian Stretching" exercise, which is believed to stimulate the energy in the body. After these stretching exercises, practitioners normally follow a sequence of postures. Classes often include elements of meditation, as well.

An article by three physicians from Weill Cornell Medical College published in the Journal of General Internal Medicine reported the conclusions of a 3-month study of community-based mind-body training methods. The study surveyed 171 adults enrolled at various Body & Brain Centers in the New York City area. All of the participants had taken ten or fewer classes at the beginning of the study.  The article concludes that participants reported "moderate improvements after 3 months of practice" with increased scores "in all [of the surveyed] domains of health-related quality of life, fewer depressive symptoms, less trait anxiety, and greater self-efficacy".

Brain Wave Vibration

Brain Wave Vibration is promoted as a mental and physical health enhancement technique developed by Ilchi Lee. According to Lee, brain waves are a type of vibration that has a significant effect on a person’s health and outlook on life.  A form of moving meditation (head-shaking), the technique was described by one Body & Brain instructor: "By shaking your head and vibrating your body, you bring healing energy. You just need to close your eyes and turn your head right and left, right and left, focusing on the center of your brain and keeping a rhythm. Afterwards, you feel very rejuvenated!" As part of CNN's three-part investigation into controversy and lawsuits surrounding Dahn Yoga, Neurosurgeon Dr. Sanjay Gupta was asked about testimonials that Brain Wave Vibration "lowered blood pressure, corrected lazy eyes, [and] even reduced symptoms of multiple sclerosis."  Gupta stated that the notion of vibrating the brain or other parts of the body to turn parts of the brain on and off is not grounded in science and that anecdotes are not empirically verifiable.

In 2010 a study sponsored by Ilchi Lee's Korean Institute of Brain Science (KIBS) and published in Neuroscience Letters examined the impact of Brain Wave Vibration training. The study showed subjects who engaged in Dahn Yoga led meditation reported lower levels of stress compared to the control group, which did not practice any sort of meditation.  Another KIBS-sponsored study published in Evidence-Based Complementary and Alternative Medicine showed that Brain Wave Vibration meditation reduced stress similarly to Iyengar Yoga and Mindfulness meditation.

Brain Education
The tradenames Brain Education, and Brain Education Systems Training (or BEST), refer to a set of exercises developed and promoted by Ilchi Lee subsequent to his "Brain Respiration" and "Dahnhak."  According to Body & Brain's Web site, after more than 27 years of practice, Lee had developed a system of exercises, breathing, and stretches “to activate the natural healing rhythms of the brain and body.”  Brain Education is described as consisting of five separate steps: brain sensitizing, brain versatilizing, brain refreshing, brain integrating, and brain mastering.  Dr. Ben Goldacre of the U.K. lambasted Ilchi Lee's brain education claims as pseudoscience in his Guardian column "Bad Science" in 2004.

History 
In 1985 the first Dahn Yoga Center opened in downtown Seoul.  By 1990, fifty locations were teaching Dahn Yoga in South Korea.   In 1991, the first U.S. Dahn Yoga Center was opened in Philadelphia, Pennsylvania.  In 1997 the Sedona Ilchi Meditation Center (SIMC) was established, hosting specialized programs open to Dahn yoga members for a fee.  Over the next ten years Dahn yoga focused on expanding its operations globally.

The Dahn Yoga Foundation was created in 2006, offering classes for free or at reduced rates in senior centers, community centers, churches, public parks, offices, schools and hospitals. In addition to the outreach classes, Dahn Yoga Foundation volunteers participate in community service projects.

In late 2015, Dahn Yoga changed its name to Body & Brain.
They also operate the "Honor’s Haven Resort and Spa" in Ellenville, NY.

Controversy 
There have been accusations that the organization operates a manipulative "cult" that uses coercive persuasion and thought reform methods to create deeply devoted Dahn masters (teachers) who persuade others to devote all their time, energy, and money to Body & Brain programs, events, and ceremonies, and to become loyal Dahn masters themselves.

In 2002, a former Body & Brain employee filed a civil lawsuit in Alameda County, California, for Unfair Business Practices and Undue Influence against Seung Heun Lee, et al. The case was reportedly settled out of court with no admission of guilt.

Several popular media outlets reported on the plaintiffs' allegations, including Glamour Magazine, WE tv, and CNN; WBZ Channel 4 News in Boston interviewed two of the claimants on June 11, 2009.

On January 5, 2010, CNN broadcast a critical report about the organization with interviews of former Brain & Body members alleging severe physical, mental and financial abuse by Brain & Body personnel and staff, including one former member stating she was coerced into donating funds to the organization by taking out student loans totaling over US$40,000. Allegations were dismissed in the United States District Court for the District of Arizona August 25, 2010.

Rolling Stone Magazine published an article in March 2010 entitled "The Yoga Cult" alleging that "Dahn's calling itself 'yoga' is just a marketing ploy to enhance its appeal to Americans;" that instead it is a mind control cult designed to part people from their money. According to the article, the group brought in $30 million in the U.S. in 2009 and charges as much as $100,000 for a seminar.

An article in Forbes magazine in July 2009 contained similar allegations against Body & Brain. It reported allegations by former members that they were pressured to train to become paid “Dahn Masters,” paying up to $10,000 each for workshops that lasted as long as three weeks. If students could not afford the training, the article states, they were encouraged to take out loans and carry credit card debt. Plaintiffs in a suit against the group claim that once they became "Dahn Masters" they were then given recruitment and revenue quotas that had them working up to 120 hours per week.

Wrongful Death Suit 
Among other media reports, a 2006 CBS news report and the Village Voice described a wrongful death lawsuit filed against Body & Brain's founder and related entities. According to the lawsuit, Julia Siverls, 41, died in 2003 from heat stroke and dehydration during a master training hike at the Ilchi Meditation Center in Sedona. The lawsuit also accuses the Lee of "breaking wage and immigration laws, evading taxes and sexually abusing female disciples." According to a document filed by the Southern District of New York of the United States District Court, the case was dismissed on August 1, 2008.

See also
 Yoga
New religious movements and cults in popular culture

References

External links
 
Korean new religions
Mind–body interventions
Yoga styles
New religious movements
ja:ダンワールド